This is a list of rural localities in Kaluga Oblast. Kaluga Oblast (Kaluzhskaya oblast) is a federal subject of Russia (an oblast). Its administrative center is the city of Kaluga. Population: 1,010,930 (2010 Census).

Locations 

 Avdeyevka
 Babynino, administrative center of Babyninsky District
 Baryatino
 Betlitsa
 Dugna
 Durakovo
 Ferzikovo
 Iznoski
 Khvastovichi
 Kosovo
 Kozlovo
 Moshonki
 Novozhdamirovo
 Peremyshl, administrative center of Peremyshlsky District
 Serpeysk
 Spas-Zagorye
 Tarutino
 Ulyanovo
 Vorotynsk

See also 
 
 Lists of rural localities in Russia

References 

Kaluga Oblast